Sergei Chernyshev, born 4 August 1952, Bohodukhiv, Kharkiv Oblast, Ukrainian Soviet Socialist Republic is a Russian philosopher, educator and expert in the field of organization and management science.

Biography 
Chernyshev was born into a military family and attended school in Akhtubinsk.

After graduating from the Moscow Institute of Physics and Technology in (1976), he worked as a management scientist at research centers and think tanks under the USSR State Committee for Science and Technology and the State Committee for Construction.

From 1980 to 1987, he was an aide and academic advisor to the Chairman of the Committee of Youth Organizations of the USSR.

Between 1983 and 1987,  Chernyshev co-authored a series of classified papers for the then Soviet leadership, in an attempt to develop a reformist ideology and a strategy of change to address the challenges facing the country. These papers were considered at over 100 meetings with leading figures in the Party and  the Government. In 1989, they were published (after being declassified) as a book, «After Communism» under the pseudonym «S.Platonov».

Between 1985 and 1991, Chernyshev was a founding member of “Project Space Shield”, which aimed to draw up a political and economic framework for a space-based anti-ballistic missile system to be developed, built and deployed jointly by the US and USSR. The project was initiated from meetings with  executives of the «Heritage Foundation», a think tank closely associated with the Ronald Reagan administration.

In 1987, Chernyshev co-founded the «Cultural Initiative Foundation», a body jointly established by the Soviet Cultural Foundation, the Peace Foundation, and the Soros Foundation, NY. For its first three years, Chernyshev led the organization as Executive Secretary of the Board. The foundation operated as an impact investing fund, supporting socially beneficial projects selected by competition.

In the same year, the Council of Ministers of the USSR established a  new research center, under the umbrella of the Scientific Research Institute for External Economic Relations, with the aim of further advancing the reformist ideas put forward in After Communism.   In 1988 and 1989 this center, in collaboration with the Cultural Initiative Foundation, initiated and coordinated a major international program known as “The Open Sector in the Soviet Economy”.  An international committee comprising experts from 16 countries was set up under the patronage of Council of Ministers chairman Nikolai Ryzhkov. Six different task forces brought together over 60 top officials from government ministries and agencies, as well as leading economists, lawyers and sociologists. The objective was to create and establish a system of inter-currency exchanges, locked into special economic zones built around economic growth poles, to facilitate modernization of the Soviet economic system and its evolutionary integration into the global economy.

From 1989 to 1993, Chernyshev was President of Humanus, a think tank.

In 1990, Chernyshev's work New Milestones (Новые Вехи) was published under his own name for the first time, in issue #1 for that year of the journal “Znamya”.

Since 1991, he has been on the Board of the Foreign Policy Association, whose President is Soviet diplomat and former Foreign Minister Alexander Bessmertnykh.

From 1993 to 1994, he was on the Academic Board of Intercenter, a British-Russian interdisciplinary center for the social sciences.

In 1993, Chernyshev published the book Meaning: A Periodic System of its Elements.

Between 1992 and 1995, Chernyshev conceived, compiled and edited a four-volume collection of essays, The Other "(‘Tertium Datur’). Readings on the  New Russian Public Identity".

1996-2006:  Professor and Head of the Institute for Corporate Entrepreneurship at  State University – Higher School of Economics.

In 1996, together with Yaroslav Kuzminov and Gleb Pavlovsky, Chernyshev founded the Russian Institute. He has been CEO of the Institute since its inception.

In 1997, the Russian Institute launched the Russian Journal, a daily online bulletin about culture, politics and society - the first of its kind in Russia. The Institute went on to deliver a number of other online and offline projects. The Russian Journal team subsequently launched a series of popular online resources including lenta.ru, gazeta.ru and strana.ru.

1997-1998:  Advisor to First Deputy Chairman, MDM Bank; participated in the Financial Institutions Development Project (FIDP) of the World Bank and the EBRD.

1997-2000: Founding member of the non-governmental Millennium Committee, which later evolved into the Russian National Millennium Committee.

1999-2006: Conceived and co-founded the Center for Corporate Entrepreneurship, a non-profit partnership, serving as its CEO.

In the summer of 2001 Chernyshev was an initiator, and an organizing committee and working group member, of the Civic Forum of Russia.

From 2005 to 2011, Chernyshev became co-founder and chairman of the Advisory Board of Management Consulting Company No. 1.

From 2006 to 2008, Chernyshev was a partner in the ROEL Group management consultancy.

In 2008, he directed a research project to analyze the efficiency of government property management in the industrial and energy sectors, commissioned by the Ministry of Industry and Trade of Russian Federation.

From 2008 to 2010, he was an independent director of the IPF-AGRO management company.

From 2009 to 2014, Chernyshev was on the Board of the Russian Association for International Co-operation (RAMS).

From 2010 to 2014, he accepted a position on the Public Council of the Ministry of Industry and Trade of Russian Federation.

From 2012 to 2015, he became Director of the Center for Corporate Entrepreneurship at the Moscow Institute of Physics and Technology (MIPT).

Since 2012, he has been Head of Research at the Laboratory of Institutional Project Engineering.

Since 2013, he has been coordinator of the Working Group on Impact Investing.

Since 2016, he has been on the Government Expert Council (Russia).

Since 2016, he is part of the team of international blockchain platform EGaaS.

He is the author of eight books (three of them co-authored) and over 170 articles

Academic staff of the Higher School of Economics
Moscow Institute of Physics and Technology alumni
1952 births
Living people